Catherine Byrne (born 26 February 1956) is a former Irish Fine Gael politician who served as a Minister of State from 2016 to 2020 and Lord Mayor of Dublin from 2005 to 2006. She served as a Teachta Dála (TD) for the Dublin South-Central constituency from 2007 to 2020.

Political career
Byrne stood unsuccessfully as a candidate at the 2002 general election, she was elected on her next attempt at the 2007 general election. She was a member of Dublin City Council for the South West Inner City local electoral area. She served for a term as Lord Mayor of Dublin in 2005.

She was party Deputy Spokesperson on Community, Rural and Gaeltacht Affairs, with special responsibility for National Drugs Strategy from 2007 to 2010. From July 2010 to March 2011, she was Spokesperson on Older Citizens.

She was the vice-chair of the Fine Gael Parliamentary Party from 2014 to 2016.

On 19 May 2016, Byrne was appointed by the Fine Gael–Independent government on the nomination of Taoiseach Enda Kenny as Minister of State at the Department of Health and at the Department of Housing, Planning, Community and Local Government with special responsibility for Communities and the National Drugs Strategy. On 20 June 2017, she was appointed by the government formed by Leo Varadkar as Minister of State at the Department of Health with special responsibility for National Drugs Strategy and Health Promotion.

She lost her seat at the general election in February 2020. She continued to serve as a Minister of State until the formation of a new government on 27 June 2020.

Personal life
Byrne was leader of St Michael's Folk/Gospel Group for 15 years and has completed a two-year Lay Ministry Course in All Hallows College, and also holds a Diploma in Catering. In 2006, she was granted a coat of arms, by the Chief Herald of Ireland.

References

 

1956 births
Living people
Fine Gael TDs
Lord Mayors of Dublin
Members of the 30th Dáil
Members of the 31st Dáil
Members of the 32nd Dáil
Ministers of State of the 32nd Dáil
Politicians from County Dublin
Women mayors of places in Ireland
Women ministers of state of the Republic of Ireland
21st-century women Teachtaí Dála